Charles Crosby Moss (March 20, 1911 – October 9, 1991) was an American Major League Baseball catcher.

References

1911 births
1991 deaths
Philadelphia Athletics players
Major League Baseball catchers
Baseball players from Mississippi
Sportspeople from Meridian, Mississippi
Ole Miss Rebels baseball players
Ole Miss Rebels football players
Minor league baseball managers
Troy Trojans (minor league) players
Federalsburg A's players
Syracuse Chiefs players
Gadsden Pilots players